The Battle of Guzów took place on 5 July 1607, at the village of Guzów in Szydłowiec County, Polish–Lithuanian Commonwealth. The confrontation was between the forces of the Zebrzydowski Rebellion (10,000 infantry and 600 cavalry under Mikołaj Zebrzydowski and Janusz Radziwiłł) against the Royalists supporting King Sigismund III Vasa (9,100 infantry, 3,200 cavalry, and 24 cannon), under the command of Polish Grand Crown Hetman (commander-in-chief) Stanisław Żółkiewski and the Lithuanian Hetman Jan Karol Chodkiewicz.

Conflict
The "Zebrzydowski rebellion" was waged by a large number of Polish-Lithuanian nobles (szlachta) who had many grievances against the Swedish-born King, who concerned himself with regaining the throne of Sweden. The Royal Army was originally sent to pacify the rebels. However, a full-scale battle ensued in the village, with 200 casualties, and it ended with the Royalists routing the rebellious factions.

During the next twelve months new "insurrections" burst forth all over the country; and peace was only restored by the proclamation (1609) of a general amnesty, which punished nobody and decided nothing. The growing unwillingness of the Grand Hetman Żółkiewski "to shed the blood of our brethren" was the cause of this unsatisfactory solution. The helpless King was obliged to concur, and henceforth abandoned all his projects of constitutional reform.

2007 mention
A Polish politician resurrected this battle after 400 years.  In a newspaper interview on March 16, 2007 with Rzeczpospolita, the opposition leader Jan Rokita, who was expected to win the September 25, 2005 Polish elections, said:

In other words, the Battle of Guzów has to be repeated with the current government of President Lech Kaczyński defeating the opposition. The government will not accept that their position is wrong. However, in the long run, some of them will wise up and concede when none of their conservative plans are implemented.

Notes

As with many historical battles, the exact details of force composition, tactics, and the actual course of the battle are lacking and sometimes contradictory.

The area around the village of Guzów also saw action during World War I. See:

References
 

1607 in the Polish–Lithuanian Commonwealth
Conflicts in 1607
Guzow